Mar Shemon VI (also written Shimun VI) was Patriarch of the Church of the East from 1504 until his death on 5 August 1538. Shemon is credited with revising the East Syriac Rite, replacing commemorations of traditional saints and martyrs with new ones, especially for those who had founded monasteries. Following his death, he was succeeded as Patriarch by his brother Shemon VII Ishoyahb, who had been natar kursya (designated successor) throughout his reign; since the reign of Shemon IV the role of Patriarch had been passed hereditarily. Shemon VI was buried alongside other Patriarchs of his era at Rabban Hormizd Monastery near Mosul, his residence while he had been Patriarch; his epitaph, recorded by Vosté, was inscribed by a priest named Israel.

Notes

Bibliography

 
 
 
 
 
 

1538 deaths
16th-century bishops of the Church of the East
Patriarchs of the Church of the East